Jonah John Goldman (August 29, 1906 – August 17, 1980) was a Major League Baseball shortstop who played for three seasons. He played with the Cleveland Indians for seven games during the 1928 Cleveland Indians season, 111 games during the 1930 Cleveland Indians season, and 30 games during the 1931 Cleveland Indians season.

He was born in Brooklyn, New York, and was Jewish. He attended Erasmus Hall High School in Brooklyn, and Syracuse University in Syracuse, New York.

References

External links

1906 births
1980 deaths
Burials at Westchester Hills Cemetery
Cleveland Indians players
Erasmus Hall High School alumni
Jewish American baseball players
Jewish Major League Baseball players
Major League Baseball shortstops
Baseball players from New York City
Syracuse Orangemen baseball players
20th-century American Jews